Baria may refer to:

Places
 Baria, Barisal, Bangladesh
 Baria, Chittagong, Bangladesh
 Baria, Gazipur Sadar Upazila, Bangladesh
Baria massacre, 1971
 Devgadh Baria, Dahod district, Gujarat, India
 Baria State, one of the princely states of India during the period of the British Raj
 Bahriyeh, or Baria, Khuzestan Province, Iran
 Bà Rịa, Bà Rịa–Vũng Tàu province, Vietnam
 Baria River, in Venezuela

Other uses
 Baria caste, Indian ethnic group
 Barium oxide, also known as baria, a chemical compound 
 David Baria (born 1962), American politician and attorney

See also